8mm 2 is a 2005 direct-to-video thriller film directed by J. S. Cardone and starring Johnathon Schaech and Lori Heuring. The film was distributed by Sony Pictures Home Entertainment.

When the film was in production, it was titled The Velvet Side of Hell.  When Sony picked up the rights to distribute it, it was re-titled 8mm 2. Although this title suggests the film to be a sequel to the 1999 Nicolas Cage film 8mm, the film has no connective elements relating it to the first 8mm film.

The film was shot entirely in Budapest.

Plot
An engaged couple, Tish and David (Heuring and Schaech), take a short vacation to Budapest. David is counsel to Tish's father, an ambassador who does not approve of their relationship, although this does not affect the couple's relationship. While in Budapest, the two indulge in many sexual activities, eventually engaging in a threesome with a local model named Risa, in a hotel in Alhambra, Spain. The sexual tryst becomes a personal issue when they receive a letter containing pictures of the ménage à trois. Realizing this escapade could ruin their careers, as well as the career of Tish's father, they venture deep into Budapest to find Risa. On their journey, they encounter their blackmailer, the housekeeper of the hotel, who told them about Risa.

He demands a sum of $200,000 for the pictures he took, and takes Tish hostage before running off, though he eventually lets her go. The blackmailer encounters David and the men begin firing at each other, but the blackmailer escapes. Going into his apartment, they find the man shot dead. A police officer, detective Kovač, later contacts them and seems to suspect them of murdering the man. Later on they find Risa dead in her apartment and presume the entire ordeal is over. Just as they begin to celebrate, another mysterious man calls them and demands $1 million in exchange for the pictures, which they agree to pay through Tish's contacts and with the help of Kovač. They arrange to meet at an old warehouse, but they do not see the man when they get there.

David tells Tish to stay in the car while he goes looking for the man inside, handing her a gun. After he disappears into the warehouse, Kovač (who had been following them) appears at Tish's side of the car and knocks on the window. Tish informs him that the man said there should be no police, but Kovač tells her that if she wants to see David leave the building alive, she must let him go. After a while Tish hears gunfire and runs into the building, shooting at an SUV which is exiting the warehouse. She then finds Kovač dead inside. Later the mysterious man calls her again and says he has David, and demands a sum of $5 million for his safe return, otherwise he will kill him. She pays the ransom money.

The man informs her that David is tied up and dying in the basement of a store in Budapest. When Tish arrives, she discovers David tied up in the basement, having limited oxygen being fed to him via a mask. She frees him. They thereafter continue their lives together, without any further interference from the man. On Christmas, Tish and her siblings go shopping in the city, and plan on going for a drink with David. However, David calls Tish and informs her he will be working late. Tish decides she will continue shopping and meet David at home. When she boards a subway train in the evening, she notices in the train-car on the rails next to hers: the porn-store owner, a Russian pimp she had tried to work for, Risa, Kovač, and the hotel's housekeeper. They are smiling as David enters the train-car to join them, and it is made clear to Tish that they plotted everything to get their hands on the $6 million she had given them throughout the events. As the train pulls away, David notices that Tish has seen him and the whole gang.

Cast 
 Johnathon Schaech as David Huxley
 Lori Heuring as Tish Harrington
 Bruce Davison as Ambassador Harrington
 Julie Benz as Lynn
 Valentine Pelka as Gorman Bellec
 Zita Görög as Risa
 Robert Cavanah as Richard
 Jane How as Mrs. Harrington
 Alex Scarlis as Perry
 Barna Illyes as Detective Kovač
 Lili Bordán as Dóra

References

External links 

2005 films
2005 crime thriller films
American crime thriller films
American direct-to-video films
Direct-to-video crime films
Direct-to-video sequel films
Direct-to-video thriller films
2000s English-language films
Films directed by J. S. Cardone
Films set in Budapest
Films shot in Budapest
Sony Pictures direct-to-video films
2000s American films